The FIA Asia-Pacific Touring Car Championship was a motorsport championship staged in 1988 and in 1994. The 1988 championship was won by New Zealand's Trevor Crowe and the 1994 champion was Joachim Winkelhock from Germany. Crowe drove a BMW M3 for fellow Kiwi John Sax, while Winkelhock drove a BMW 318i for Schnitzer Motorsport. In 1996–1999 the series was re-vamped into the South East Asia Touring Car Zone Challenge mainly with local drivers only. In 2000 it changed to the FIA Asian Touring Car Championship.

Champions

References

 1988 Results
 1988 Standings
 1994 Entry list
 1994 Standings
 1994–2006 Asian Touring Car history

 
Touring car racing series
Touring Car Championship, Asia-Pacific
Recurring sporting events established in 1988
Recurring events disestablished in 1994
Defunct auto racing series